Totladoh dam, is a gravity dam on the Pench river near Ramtek in Nagpur district in the state of Maharashtra and adjoining Madhya Pradesh in India.

Specifications

Purpose
160 MW hydroelectric plant called Pench Hydro power station is located at the foot of the dam.

See also

 Dams in Maharashtra
 Godavari River Basin Irrigation Projects
 List of reservoirs and dams in India
 List of power stations in India
 Top 5 Dams in Maharashtra
Money

References

External links
 

Dams in Nagpur district
Dams completed in 1989
1989 establishments in Maharashtra